Georges Glasser (24 August 1907 – January 2002) was a French tennis player, corporate executive and president of the Tennis Club de Paris. As a player, he was particularly successful in mixed doubles claiming several titles during his career. He was ranked the 8th among the top French players in 1932.

Biography
He was born in Paris 24 August 1907, son of the general manager of the Compagnie Générale des Eaux, George Glasser graduated at the École Polytechnique in 1926. In 1931 he became an engineer at the École nationale des ponts et chaussées. The same year he became the assistant to the Director General of the Préfecture des Hauts-de-Seine and also the member of Corps of Bridges and Roads. In 1948 he was elected the president of the National Society of Southwest aircraft constructions (SNCASO) in 1948, while also acting as the vice president of French state-owned aircraft manufacturer Sud Aviation. He persuaded his devotion to tennis by being the president of the Tennis Club de Paris in 1951–1965, the club which he played for when he had been an active sportsman. In 1957 he was appointed president of the Society for the Study of jet Propulsion (SEPR) and finally chief executive of Alsthom between 1958 and 1975. Died in January 2002.

Tennis finals

Singles

Finals (1)

Doubles

Finals (6)

Mixed doubles (5)

References

External links 

Interview with Georges Glasser (in French)

1907 births
2002 deaths
École Polytechnique alumni
French male tennis players
Tennis players from Paris
French chief executives
Alstom
Date of death missing